Edwin Henry Spanier (August 8, 1921 – October 11, 1996) was an American mathematician at the University of California at Berkeley, working in algebraic topology. He co-invented Spanier–Whitehead duality and Alexander–Spanier cohomology, and wrote what was for a long time the standard textbook on algebraic topology .

Spanier attended the University of Minnesota, graduating in 1941. During World War II, he served in the United States Army Signal Corps. He received his Ph.D. degree from the University of Michigan in 1947 for the thesis Cohomology Theory for General Spaces  written under the direction of Norman Steenrod. After spending a year as a research fellow at the Institute for Advanced Study in Princeton, New Jersey, in 1948 he was appointed to the faculty of the University of Chicago, and then a professor at UC Berkeley in 1959. He had 17 doctoral students, including Morris Hirsch and Elon Lages Lima.

Publications

References
 Retrieved on 2008-01-17
 Retrieved on 2008-01-17
Obituary, at the Notices of the American Mathematical Society
Photos, at the Mathematical Research Institute of Oberwolfach

20th-century American mathematicians
Topologists
University of California, Berkeley faculty
University of Chicago faculty
University of Minnesota alumni
University of Michigan alumni
United States Army personnel of World War II
Academics from Washington, D.C.
1921 births
1996 deaths
Fair division researchers